Kosalar is a village in Khojaly District of Azerbaijan. The village had an Azerbaijani majority prior to their expulsion during the First Nagorno-Karabakh War. It was captured by Armenian forces on 1992 and has since been administrated as part of Askeran Province of the self-proclaimed Republic of Artsakh.

References

External links 

Populated places in Khojaly District